Sittipong Manaowarn is a retired professional footballer from Thailand.

External links
Profile at Thaipremierleague.co.th

Living people
1982 births
Sittipong Manaowarn
Sittipong Manaowarn
Sittipong Manaowarn
Sittipong Manaowarn
Association football goalkeepers